The provinces of Denmark are statistical divisions of Denmark, positioned between the administrative regions and municipalities. They are not administrative divisions, nor subject for any kind of political elections, but are mainly for statistical use.

This is a list of the eleven Danish provinces and the regions they belong to. There are five regions (EU standard NUTS 2) and eleven provinces (EU standard NUTS 3). The provinces Copenhagen City and Copenhagen surroundings are largely build up areas, the same applies also for large parts of East Zealand and North Zealand.

Although East Zealand (NUTS-3 level) belongs to healthcare Region Zealand (NUTS-2 level), in other respects (like public transport, road maintenance, metropolitan future planning, known as the Finger Plan in all versions since 1949, regional radio and television etc.) it belongs to the Metropolitan Area of Greater Copenhagen. This has been the case since 1970, but at that time the East Zealand province was an administrational and political unit, called Roskilde Amt.

Areas and population within the provinces

The provinces Copenhagen City, Copenhagen Surroundings, North Zealand and East Zealand together comprise the Copenhagen metropolitan area. They are together both the planning area for the Copenhagen area, also known as the Finger Plan and the Copenhagen Public transport area. Close to 2 million people live in their joint area of about 2,770 square kilometres. This is also the best area to use for comparisons with other cities of similar size.

Occasionally the East Jutland province, with around 850,000 inhabitants in 5,841 square kilometres, is labeled as Greater Aarhus, however less than 40% of its population lives in Aarhus municipality.

References

Administrative divisions of Denmark
Denmark
Denmark geography-related lists